Holland is a town in Orleans County, Vermont, United States. The population was 632 at the 2020 census.

It derives its name from Holland.

Government

Town

 Town Clerk – Diane Judd
 Treasurer – Diane Judd
 Delinquent Tax Collector – Diane Judd
 Auditor – Gaetane Patenaude
 Agent – Diane Judd
 Lister – Brian Currier
 Road Commissioner (appointed) – Tommy Charest
 Planning Commissioners – Albert Hauver, Marc Farrow, Gary Champney Jr.
 Solid Waste Supervisor – Winston Dowland
 Grand Juror – Speedo Deskins
 Cemetery Commissioner – Michael Percy
 Constable – Clara Nadeau
 Moderator – Eernest Emmerson
 Budget – $475,467

Building code

School District

 Member, Union School Board – Lucy Cannon (2009) and Diane Rowlee (2010)Diana Emmerson
 Chair, School Board – Diana Limlaw
 Member, Board – Lori Ackerson (2009), Michael Lyon (2010), Diana Limlaw (2010)
 Principal – Linda Phalen
 Budget – $966,110

Geography
According to the United States Census Bureau, the town has a total area of 38.2 square miles (99.0 km2), of which 37.6 square miles (97.4 km2) is land and 0.6 square mile (1.6 km2) (1.65%) is water.

Holland is the highest town in Orleans County. Perhaps due to its high altitude, Holland has historically had the coolest weather and highest rate of snowfall in Orleans County.

Holland contains three unincorporated villages:
 Holland Center
 Holland Pond
 Tice Hollow

History
The original town was laid out in quarter sections, that is, each grantee had about 1/4 of a square mile, or  each.

In 1810, there was a smallpox epidemic.

In 1973, a promoter staged a rock concert which 30,000, mostly young people, attended, overwhelming local resources.

Demographics

As of the census of 2000, there were 588 people, 219 households, and 160 families residing in the town.  The population density was 15.6 people per square mile (6.0/km2).  There were 354 housing units at an average density of 9.4 per square mile (3.6/km2).  The racial makeup of the town was 96.94% White, 0.51% African American, 2.04% Native American, 0.17% Asian, 0.17% from other races, and 0.17% from two or more races. Hispanic or Latino of any race were 0.17% of the population.

There were 219 households, out of which 39.7% had children under the age of 18 living with them, 58.9% were couples living together and joined in either marriage or civil union, 9.6% had a female householder with no husband present, and 26.5% were non-families. 20.1% of all households were made up of individuals, and 7.3% had someone living alone who was 65 years of age or older.  The average household size was 2.68 and the average family size was 3.03.

In the town, the population was spread out, with 32.1% under the age of 18, 5.6% from 18 to 24, 30.6% from 25 to 44, 22.6% from 45 to 64, and 9.0% who were 65 years of age or older.  The median age was 35 years. For every 100 females, there were 94.7 males.  For every 100 females age 18 and over, there were 97.5 males.

Economy

Personal Income
The median income for a household in the town was $28,359, and the median income for a family was $29,297. Males had a median income of $22,500 versus $16,528 for females. The per capita income for the town was $11,936.  About 12.6% of families and 15.1% of the population were below the poverty line, including 12.8% of those under age 18 and 10.8% of those age 65 or over. Holland has the lowest per capita income of any place in Orleans County.

Notable people 

 Robert W. Castle, Episcopal priest, activist and actor (Philadelphia, Beloved, Rachel Getting Married)
 Lucy M. Hall (1843–1907), physician, writer
 William Sargent Ladd, banker, 5th mayor of Portland, Oregon
 Horace Austin Warner Tabor, prospector, businessman, and politician

Footnotes

References

External links
  History of Holland from the Orleans County Historical Society

 
Towns in Orleans County, Vermont
Towns in Vermont